Strasburger is a German locational surname, which originally meant a person from Strasbourg, France or Strasburg, Germany. The name may refer to:

Charles Strasburger, American college men's basketball head coach
Eduard Strasburger (1844–1912), German botanist
Henryk Leon Strasburger (1887–1951), German internist
Julius Strasburger (1871–1934), Polish politician
Larry Hollingsworth Strasburger (1935–2015), American psychiatrist
Maria-Paulina Strasburger (1878–1945), Polish politician
Scott Strasburger (born 1963), American football player
Paul Strasburger (born 1946), British politician 
Victor C. Strasburger (born 1949), American pediatrician

See also
Straßburger (disambiguation)

References

German-language surnames
Jewish surnames